In enzymology, a glucose-1-phosphate cytidylyltransferase is an enzyme that catalyzes the chemical reaction

CTP + alpha-D-glucose 1-phosphate  diphosphate + CDP-glucose

Thus, the two substrates of this enzyme are CTP and alpha-D-glucose 1-phosphate, whereas its two products are diphosphate and CDP-glucose.

This enzyme belongs to the family of transferases, specifically those transferring phosphorus-containing nucleotide groups (nucleotidyltransferases).  The systematic name of this enzyme class is CTP:alpha-D-glucose-1-phosphate cytidylyltransferase. Other names in common use include CDP glucose pyrophosphorylase, cytidine diphosphoglucose pyrophosphorylase, cytidine diphosphate glucose pyrophosphorylase, cytidine diphosphate-D-glucose pyrophosphorylase, and CTP:D-glucose-1-phosphate cytidylyltransferase.  This enzyme participates in starch and sucrose metabolism and nucleotide sugars metabolism.

Structural studies

References

EC 2.7.7
Enzymes of known structure